Gibney may refer to:

People
Alex Gibney, US film director and producer; son of Frank Gibney
Bruce Gibney, US writer and venture capitalist
Claude Gibney Finch-Davies (1875–1920), British soldier, ornithologist and painter
Edmond Gibney (1974–), Irish Olympic Three Day Eventing rider
Frank Gibney, US journalist, editor, writer and scholar; father of Alex Gibney
Hal Gibney, US radio and television announcer
Jennifer Gibney (born 1964), Irish actress
Matthew Gibney (1835–1925), Irish-born Australian bishop
Nancy Flagg Gibney (1922–1980), American magazine writer and editor (after whom Gibney Beach is named)
Rebecca Gibney (1964–), New Zealand-born, Australia-based actress
Susan Gibney, US actress
Tom Gibney, retired Canadian television anchor

Fictional characters
Kyle Gibney, real name of Wild Child in the Marvel Comic publications

Places
Gibney Beach, beach on St John Island in the United States Virgin Islands
Gibney Reef, reef in the Windmill Islands, Antarctica